Brøndbyvester is a Danish town, seat and main settlement of the Brøndby Municipality, in the Region Hovedstaden. It is known for housing the stadium of football team Brøndby IF.

History
The town is the original core of Brøndby and sometimes is simply named in that way.

Geography
The town is situated close to the coast, in the south-western suburb of Copenhagen and is part of its urban area.

Notable people 

 Per Bjerregaard (born 1946 in Randers) a Danish educated physician, former footballer and chairman of  Brøndby IF
 Henrik Carlsen (born 1959) a Danish composer, record producer, singer and keyboardist; grew up in Brøndby

Sport 

 Erik Rasmussen (born 1960) a former Danish footballer with 450 club caps and a manager
 Morten Cramer (born 1967) a Danish educated police officer, formerly a football goalkeeper
 Karim Zaza (born 1975) a Danish retired professional football goalkeeper with 412 club caps
 Helle Nielsen (born 1981) a Danish badminton player
 Anders Jochumsen (born 1981) a former Danish footballer, current assistant manager of BK Frem
 Martin Pedersen (born 1983) a Danish professional road bicycle racer
 Zishan Shah (born 1987) a Danish cricketer
 Mikkel Bødker (born 1989) a Danish ice hockey right winger currently playing for HC Lugano
 Martin Hansen (born 1990) a Danish football goalkeeper for Hannover 96
 Hamid Shah (born 1992) a Danish cricketer
 Andreas Stokbro (born 1997) a Danish cyclist
 Caroline Pleidrup (born 2000) a Danish footballer, plays for Brøndby IF

See also
Brøndby IF
Brøndby Strand
Brøndby Stadium

External links

Municipal seats in the Capital Region of Denmark
Municipal seats of Denmark
Copenhagen metropolitan area
Cities and towns in the Capital Region of Denmark
Brøndby Municipality